Tawanta is an unincorporated community in Jones County, in the U.S. state of Mississippi.

History

Tawanta was founded in 1882. The name "Tawanta" is purported to mean "wide, broad" in the Choctaw language. The community was once a flag station and is located on the Norfolk Southern Railway.

References

Unincorporated communities in Mississippi
Unincorporated communities in Jones County, Mississippi
Mississippi placenames of Native American origin